The first Pembrokeshire County Council was established in 1889 under the Local Government Act 1888, to govern the administrative county of Pembrokeshire. This first county council was abolished in 1974 under the Local Government Act 1972.

History
Pembrokeshire County Council was created under the Local Government Act 1888 to take over the local government responsibilities of the Pembrokeshire Quarter Sessions. The first elections were held in January 1889, and the council came into its powers on 1 April 1889. Henry George Allen, a Liberal, was appointed the first chairman of the county council. The first formal meeting of the county council was held on 1 April 1889 at the Shire Hall in Haverfordwest.

Subdivisions
District councils subordinate to the county council were established under the Local Government Act 1894, replacing the earlier sanitary districts (except those which were municipal boroughs). The districts of Pembrokeshire from 1894 to 1974 were:

Premises
The county council generally held its meetings at the Shire Hall at 47 High Street, Haverfordwest. In 1923 the council acquired the former Pembrokeshire and Haverfordwest Infirmary at the corner of St Thomas Green and Winch Lane, which had been built in 1872, converting it to become their main offices. The old infirmary became known as the County Offices, and remained the council's headquarters until its abolition in 1974. The building was subsequently used as an area office by Dyfed County Council. Following the re-establishment of Pembrokeshire County Council in 1996 and the opening of a new County Hall in 1999 the County Offices became surplus to requirements and so were demolished and a leisure centre built on the site, opening in 2009.

Abolition
The council was abolished under the Local Government Act 1972 on 31 March 1974. From 1 April 1974 the area was split between the two new districts of Preseli and South Pembrokeshire, both of which were subordinate to the new county of Dyfed.

As a result of further local government reorganisation under the Local Government (Wales) Act 1994, which came into force on 1 April 1996, a new unitary authority of Pembrokeshire was established, with its council also taking the name Pembrokeshire County Council.

See also
 1889 Pembrokeshire County Council election
 1892 Pembrokeshire County Council election

References

County councils of Wales
1889 establishments in Wales
1974 disestablishments in Wales